Jorge Gibson Brown (3 April 1880 – 3 January 1936) was an Argentine footballer of Scottish ancestry, who was one of the most important figures in the early years of the sport in that country. During his career, he won a total of 21 titles playing for Alumni and Quilmes and captained the Argentina national team between 1908 and 1913.

Biography

Jorge started playing football in the reserve team of the English High School A.C. team. In 1896 he joined Club Palermo where he played until 1897 when he moved to Lanús Athletic Club.

In 1900 he returned to the English High School A.C. where he was part of the team that won the 1900 league championship. In 1901 the club changed its name to "Alumni Athletic Club" and over the following decade the club dominated Argentine football, winning 9 of the 12 championships between 1900 and its dissolution in 1911.

Jorge Brown made his debut for the Argentina national team on 20 July 1902, being part of the line-up that played Uruguay in the Albion Football Club field, playing as forward and even scoring a goal. He went on to make 23 appearances, scoring four goals. Brown also captained the team for 18 matches between 1908 and 1913.

After the dissolution of Alumni, Jorge Brown joined Quilmes where he won the 1912 league championship. He played for the club until 1914.

Between 1914 and 1927 he played cricket competing at the "Liga de los Sábados" (Saturday League), a local competition where he captained Buenos Aires Cricket Club, an institution he would go on to serve as president. Brown played in the cricket league during 13 years.

Brown had four brothers who were also Argentine international players; Alfredo, Carlos, Eliseo and Ernesto, as well as one cousin, Juan Domingo. Two other brothers, Diego and Tomás, were also footballers.

Honours
Brown won a total of 21 titles during his career, 20 with Alumni and 1 with Quilmes.

Alumni:
Primera División: 1900, 1902, 1903, 1905, 1906, 1907, 1909, 1910, 1911
Copa de Competencia Jockey Club: 1907, 1908, 1909
Copa de Honor Municipalidad de Buenos Aires: 1905, 1906
Tie Cup: 1903, 1906, 1907, 1908, 1909
Copa de Honor Cousenier: 1906

Quilmes:
Primera División: 1912

See also
 Alfredo Brown
 Carlos Brown
 Eliseo Brown
 Ernesto Brown
 Juan Domingo Brown
 Diego Brown
 Tomás Brown
 Alumni Athletic Club

References

1880 births
1936 deaths
Sportspeople from Buenos Aires Province
Argentine footballers
Argentina international footballers
Association football defenders
Association football forwards
Argentine Primera División players
Club Atlético Lanús footballers
Quilmes Atlético Club footballers
Alumni Athletic Club players
Argentine people of Scottish descent
Brown family (Argentina)